Løken or Loken can refer to:

 Løken, Norwegian village
 Løken Moraines, near the Windmill Islands, Antarctica
 Løken Pond in South Georgia, a British overseas territory in the southern Atlantic Ocean
 Senior–Løken syndrome, a congenital eye disorder
Løken (surname)